The 1999 New Orleans Saints season was the Saints' thirty-third NFL season. This was Mike Ditka's third and final season as the Saints' head coach, as he was fired, along with his entire coaching staff and general manager Bill Kuharich, three days after the conclusion of the season.

During 1999, the Saints became the first team to lose to the expansion Cleveland Browns and in the process became the only team since the NFL/AFL merger in 1970 to lose to the last winless team in successive seasons.

Offseason

NFL Draft 

With the only pick in the draft the New Orleans Saints selected RB Ricky Williams out of the University of Texas with the fifth pick in the first round. The Saints traded all of their draft picks in the 1999 draft in order to move up so they could draft Williams, as well as a first round pick in the 2000 NFL Draft that eventually was used by the Washington Redskins to draft LaVar Arrington.

Personnel

Staff

Roster

Regular season

Schedule

Standings

Statistics

Passing

Rushing

Receiving

Kick Returns

Punt Returns

Punting

Kicking

Interceptions

Sacks

References 

 Saints on Pro Football Reference
 Saints on jt-sw.com

New Orleans Saints
New Orleans Saints seasons
New